David Shoalts (born 7 February 1955) was a Canadian sports reporter and columnist for The Globe and Mail.

A graduate from Conestoga College, Shoalts has also worked for the Calgary Herald, Calgary Sun and Toronto Sun. In 2009, Shoalts and journalist Paul Waldie were awarded the Outstanding Sportswriting Award by Sports Media Canada for their coverage of the Phoenix Coyotes.

Early life and education
Shoalts was born in Niagara Falls, Ontario and grew up in nearby Wainfleet. He stated that while his father, uncle, and brother were in the construction business, he took after his mother, who wrote a gardening column for many years in a local newspaper. He graduated from Pelham District High School in 1973 and attended the University of Waterloo before transferring to the journalism department at Conestoga College. Shoalts stated he did not take his education seriously until after his fourth year at the University of Waterloo, when he decided he wanted to pursue journalism as a career. At Conestoga College, he wrote for the student newspaper, Spoke.

Career
During his year at Conestoga College, Shoalts earned an internship at The Kitchener-Waterloo Record, where he covered the Canadian Football League (CFL) and various other sports. Shoalts's first full-time job was at the Calgary Herald beginning in January, 1979. He covered high-school and university sports as well as golf. In August, 1980, he moved to the Calgary Sun to cover the Calgary Stampeders of the CFL and the Calgary Flames, the city's new NHL team./>

In 1983, Shoalts was hired by the Toronto Sun as a copy editor. In 1984, Shoalts left the Sun for The Globe and Mail to work on page layout and design, although he eventually earned a writing position. In 1986, Shoalts covered the CFL, moving to the NHL in 1989. He also worked in the Globes news department in 1991 before returning to sports and hockey. While working for the Globe in 1993, Shoalts and William Houston published a book titled Greed and Glory: The Fall of Hockey Czar Alan Eagleson.

Shoalts became a hockey columnist for the Globe in 2003. 

In 2007, Shoalts wrote a book titled Tales From The Toronto Maple Leafs, a series of anecdotes from various Toronto Maple Leafs personnel about the history of the hockey team. It has been reissued several times with updated versions. In 2009, Shoalts and journalist Paul Waldie won the Outstanding Sportswriting Award from Sports Media Canada for their coverage of the Phoenix Coyotes. In 2010, Conestoga College awarded him the Alumni of Distinction Award for Media and Design.

In 2018, Shoalts published a book titled Hockey Fight in Canada: The Big Media Faceoff Over the NHL which described the NHL ending their deal with CBC and signing with Rogers. The book was a finalist for the National Business Book Award. 

He retired in the summer of 2019 after more than 35 years at the newspaper.

Publications
The following is a list of major publications:
 Greed and Glory: The Fall of Hockey Czar Alan Eagleson (1993)
 Tales from the Toronto Maple Leafs (2007)
 Tales from the Toronto Maple Leafs Locker Room: A Collection of the Greatest Maple Leafs Stories Ever Told (2012)
 Hockey Fight in Canada: The Big Media Faceoff Over the NHL (2018)

Personal life
Shoalts and his wife Yvonne have two children.  However his son Matthew died in 2012.

In 2016, Shoalts began performing stand-up comedy.

References 

Living people
The Globe and Mail people
Hockey writers
People from the Regional Municipality of Niagara
Canadian male non-fiction writers
20th-century Canadian non-fiction writers
Canadian columnists
Canadian sports journalists
Canadian sportswriters
Conestoga College alumni
Writers from Ontario
1955 births